Marc-Antoine Pellin (born September 8, 1987 in Orléans, France) is a French basketball player. He currently plays for Orléans Loiret Basket. A 1.67 m playmaker, he is a member of the French national team.

External links 
Euroleague.net Profile
fiba.com Profile

1987 births
Living people
Centre Fédéral de Basket-ball players
Chorale Roanne Basket players
French men's basketball players
Le Mans Sarthe Basket players
Orléans Loiret Basket players
Point guards
Sportspeople from Orléans